James Donald French (ca. 1936 – 10 August 1966) was an American criminal who was the last person executed under Oklahoma's death penalty laws prior to Furman v. Georgia, which suspended capital punishment in America from 1972 until 1976.

Background and crime
James French was serving a life sentence in the Oklahoma State Penitentiary in McAlester for killing Frank Boone, a West Virginia motorist who had picked him up while hitchhiking, in 1958. French had requested a death sentence for that charge, but the jury handed down a life sentence anyway, against his wishes. Dismayed, French wrote several letters to the governor asking for a new trial, one in which he could get a death sentence, but the letters went unanswered and ignored.

While serving his life sentence, French was placed with inmate Eddie Lee Shelton. The two did not get along, in addition to French growing tired of prison life.

On October 27, 1961, French attacked Shelton. According to Oklahoma County District Judge Charles Owens, who was an assistant attorney general during French's time on death row, French "determined the victim should have a last meal," so he treated Shelton to a steak sandwich from the prison canteen and "allowed" Shelton to go to breakfast. Upon Shelton's return from breakfast, "French wrapped a towel around [Shelton’s] neck" and strangled Shelton to death.

French was fully aware of the consequences for his actions, making an immediate voluntary confession and explaining that he murdered Shelton because Shelton "was stupid [...] and refused to shape up." When he went to trial for Shelton's murder, French asked the judge to sentence him to death and deny all future appeals because he wished to die in the electric chair, and he explained that he committed the murder to compel the state of Oklahoma to execute him. The judge obliged his request, imposing a death sentence.

Trials and appeals

Third parties tried to save French's life during his time on death row. He won a total of three trials thanks to the efforts of attorneys working against his wishes. After the first trial, those attorneys won French a new trial based on the fact that jury members saw French in shackles while he was in court, which biased their view of him during the trial. After the second trial, attorneys argued that the judge who presided over the trial gave an improper response to an inquiry by the jury regarding what life imprisonment meant. French had his third trial in 1965. All three trials involved French making a full, voluntary, and eager confession to Shelton's murder and giving the exact same reason each time. Each trial ended with a death sentence. The third was the only one that was not successfully appealed, largely because French himself wrote to the Oklahoma Courts of Appeal asking them to reject all future legal efforts made on his behalf to save his life, and the Court of Appeals obliged him.

During his time on death row, psychiatric tests revealed that French was of above average intelligence. Unlike most death row inmates, French had completed high school and two years of post-secondary education at college. He was also the author of a book on crime compulsion called We. The tests also revealed that French had long been suicidal, with one psychiatrist writing that French had "seriously attempted suicide several times in the past but always 'chickened out' at the last minute. His basic (and obviously abnormal) motive in murdering his inoffensive cellmate was to force the state to deliver to him the electrocution to which he felt entitled and which he deeply desired."

Execution and last words

At the time of French's execution, the death penalty was at a near standstill nationwide as a result of changing sentiments towards the death penalty. Oklahoma's last execution before French's was that of Richard Dare, who died in the electric chair on June 1, 1963. Dare was executed for murdering his father-in-law and notably spent 717 days awaiting execution after his death sentence, which was unusually long for the time. Dare was executed only after a protracted legal struggle.

Charles Owens was quoted as saying, almost two decades after French's execution, that had French not aggressively pursued his own death, he likely never would have been executed because of the Furman v. Georgia ruling that was to come six years after French's execution, a ruling that would see the U.S. Supreme Court place a nationwide moratorium on the death penalty and see every state forced to re-sentence all condemned inmates to life imprisonment. French's psychiatrist, upon reflecting on the crimes that sent French to the death chamber, also wrote that "[i]f Oklahoma had not had the death penalty, it is likely that both of the men murdered by James French would still be alive."

Nevertheless, after French "resisted all efforts to spare his life," he walked calmly into the execution chamber at 10:00 p.m on August 10, 1966; the Associated Press reporter at the scene wrote that "James Donald French got what he demanded: death in the electric chair," and commented that "He faced death with the same cockiness he faced life."  

In later years, French's last words before his death by electric chair would be said to have been "How's this for your headline? 'French Fries'".  The story appeared as early as 1977 in The Book of Lists, but contemporaneous accounts of the execution mentioned only that when prison warden Ray Page asked if French had any last words, "French replied: 'Everything's already been said.'" 

French himself did make a quip about French fries. However, the remark was not made at his execution, but days prior, when French discussed his upcoming execution with reporter Bob Gregory. Gregory attended the execution and corroborated that French's real last words were, "Everything's already been said." Days prior, however, Gregory had met with French for an interview in the office of the warden of the Oklahoma State Penitentiary. During the interview, Gregory reported that the following exchange took place:

The execution of James French was the last execution by electric chair in the United States before Furman v. Georgia. Overall, it was the third to last nationwide, only being succeeded by that of Aaron Mitchell in California's gas chamber on April 12, 1967, and Luis Monge in Colorado's gas chamber on June 2, 1967. After the moratorium on capital punishment was lifted, Gary Gilmore became the first person to be executed nationwide when he volunteered for death by firing squad in Utah on January 17, 1977. Two years later, the first post-Furman electrocution occurred when John Spenkelink was executed in Florida on May 25, 1979. The first post-Furman execution in Oklahoma did not occur until September 10, 1990, when Charles Coleman was executed via lethal injection at the Oklahoma State Penitentiary. It was the first execution carried out in Oklahoma in over twenty-four years, since that of French's in 1966.

References

External links
French v. State, 1966 OK CR 84 416 P.2d 171.

1930s births
1966 deaths
American people executed for murder
20th-century executions by Oklahoma
People executed by Oklahoma by electric chair
20th-century executions of American people
People convicted of murder by Oklahoma